Cover story or Cover Story may refer to:

 A magazine or newspaper article whose subject appears on that issue's front cover, and may be profiled in depth.
 A fictitious explanation intended to hide one's real motive; see disinformation, cover-up and limited hangout
 Cover Story (2000 film), a Malayalam-language film
 Cover Story (2002 film), an American film
 Cover Story (2011 film), a Hindi-language film
 Cover Story (TV series), an American documentary series on the  Game Show Network (GSN), which debuted in 2018

See also
Cover (disambiguation)
Story (disambiguation)